Sundown Trail is a 1931 American pre-Code Western film written and directed by Robert F. Hill and starring Tom Keene, Marion Shilling, Nick Stuart, Hooper Atchley and Stanley Blystone. It was released on September 11, 1931, by RKO Pictures.

Her male co-stars liked to tease Marion Shilling during down time and frequently made her blush with their risque comments. "A bit later in my life when I became more hip, I thought of some great comebacks, but as with so many marvelous afterthoughts, it was too late, alas, too late." They also laughed together about their director, who they dubbed "Bring 'Em Back Alive." "Immaculately groomed, he wore riding pants and pith helmet, and everything he said was with emphasis. His booming voice and the way he dashed about left no doubt to onlookers as to who was directing the picture," Shilling said.

The film is preserved in the Library of Congress collection.

Cast 
 Tom Keene as Buck Sawyer
 Marion Shilling as	Dorothy 'Dottie' Beals
 Nick Stuart as Flash Prescott
 Hooper Atchley as Mr. Marston
 Stanley Blystone as Joe Currier
 Alma Chester as Ma Stoddard
 William Welsh as Pa Stoddard
 Murdock MacQuarrie as Executor of the Estate
 Louise Beavers as Auntie Jenny

References

External links 
 
 
 
 

1931 films
American black-and-white films
1930s English-language films
RKO Pictures films
American Western (genre) films
1931 Western (genre) films
Films directed by Robert F. Hill
Films scored by Arthur Lange
1930s American films